Daniel Arcila (born 15 October 1993) is a Colombian footballer.

Career
Arcila joined NASL club Fort Lauderdale Strikers from Colombian side Deportivo Olimpia on 8 March 2013. He made his debut two months later in a 1–0 away victory over FC Edmonton. In 2018, he played in the Canadian Soccer League with Hamilton City SC.

References

External links
 Fort Lauderdale Strikers bio

Fort Lauderdale Strikers players
1993 births
Living people
Colombian footballers
Colombian expatriate footballers
Association football defenders
Expatriate soccer players in the United States
North American Soccer League players
Hamilton City SC players
Canadian Soccer League (1998–present) players
People from Pereira, Colombia